Yan Huang Zisun is a term that represents the Chinese people and refers to an ethnocultural identity based on a common ancestry associated with a mythological origin. 

This term is connected to Yandi (炎帝) and Huangdi (黃帝), in which both figures are considered the legendary ancestors of the Huaxia people who themselves are ancestral to the Han people. The term most specifically refers to the Han ethnic group, as it does not include groups who do not share the legendary ancestors.

Modern usage
To this day, the Chinese still refer to themselves with this term.

The derivation of the term is mentioned as Yan Huang Shizhou (炎黃世胄) in the National Flag Anthem of the Republic of China.

Ma Ying-jeou, ex-president of the Republic of China (Taiwan), has used this term to refer to all Chinese people in the context of his view on cross-strait relations.

See also
Huaxia, confederation of pre-Qin peoples.
Yanhuang, an ancestral group around the Yellow River.

References

Chinese culture
Chinese mythology
Han Chinese
Collective identity
Chinese traditions